Sheldon R. Songstad (June 19, 1938 – December 13, 2019) was an American politician. He served in the South Dakota House of Representatives from 1971 to 1974 and in the Senate from 1975 to 1978 and 1985 to 1988.

References

1938 births
Living people
Republican Party members of the South Dakota House of Representatives
Republican Party South Dakota state senators